INS Shardul was a  of the Indian Navy.

History
Built at the Gdańsk Shipyard in Poland, INS Shardul was commissioned on 24 December 1975. She was decommissioned in June 1997.

Her legacy was carried forward by the lead vessel of the s, .

See also
 Ships of the Indian Navy

References

Kumbhir-class tank landing ships
1975 ships
Ships built in Gdańsk